Vehicle location data is the big data collection of vehicle locations, including automatic vehicle location data. This usually includes times and often photographs as well.
 Common methods of data collection include automatic number plate recognition of vehicle registration plates from images collected by cameras mounted on vehicles or fixtures along roads, 

as well as radio-frequency identification (RFID) from dedicated short-range communications transponders
 (such as those used for electronic toll collection and parking lots).  Databases of this information may be maintained by government or private entities.  Private companies use vehicle location data for vehicle repossession and consumer profiling. Government databases have been subjected to legal orders for location data. Access may be restricted to use in criminal cases, but may also be available for civil cases, such as divorce.

Automatic number plate recognition

Vehicle registration plates may be automatically scanned with equipment, mountable on vehicles, that identifies an image characteristic of a registration plates, takes a photograph, and reads and records the registration number. Such scanning may be done by government  or private industry.  Private industry collects this information for profit through, directly or indirectly, activities such as consumer profiling and repossession. Companies have collected over 1 billion scans of registration plates in the United States, stored in multiple national databases.

Transponders
Radio-frequency identification (RFID) read from dedicated short-range communication transponders voluntarily obtained by citizens for electronic toll collection enable recording of time and location data at toll crossings. Scanning equipment has also been installed at additional, non-toll locations, enabling further data collection.  Transponders have also been hacked, allowing reading and tracking by unauthorized parties.

Privacy concerns
The American Civil Liberties Union issued a report on license plate tracking, finding that the vast majority of scans collected are the vehicles of innocent persons.

See also 
 Indoor positioning system (IPS)
 Parking lot

References

Automatic number plate recognition
Mass surveillance
Geographic position
Geopositioning